Vyezd is a rural locality (a village) and the administrative center of Kupriyanovskoye Rural Settlement, Gorokhovetsky District, Vladimir Oblast, Russia. The population was 257 as of 2010. There are 3 streets.

Geography 
Vyezd is located 5 km south of Gorokhovets (the district's administrative centre) by road. Morozovka is the nearest rural locality.

References 

Rural localities in Gorokhovetsky District